SBK-07: Superbike World Championship also known as Superbike World Championship in North America is the official Superbike World Championship video game and offers the official races, sessions, teams and riders of the real 2007 Superbike World Championship season. The game allows the player to race in 5 game modes: Quick Race, Time Attack, Race weekend, Championship and Challenges in a variety of difficulties and weather conditions.

The developer and the publisher say that the game aims to capture the attention of core gamers but also appeal to the casual gamers. SBK-07 can be rendered more arcade or simulation by enabling or disabling a series of realism options. Milestone had also developed MotoGP '07.

See also
Moto GP'07, the concurrent installment of the Moto GP series developed by Milestone for the PlayStation 2

External links

Superbike World Championship video games
2007 video games
PlayStation 2 games
PlayStation Network games
PlayStation Portable games
Valcon Games games
Video games developed in Italy
Video games set in Australia
Video games set in the Czech Republic
Video games set in France
Video games set in Italy
Video games set in Qatar
Cancelled Xbox 360 games
Milestone srl games
Black Bean Games games
Multiplayer and single-player video games